The AEC Bridgemaster was a front-engined low-height double-decker bus chassis manufactured by AEC.

History
The AEC Bridgemaster was introduced by AEC in 1956 to meet the demand of low-height double-deckers from municipal and independent bus operators across the United Kingdom, which were barred from purchasing the Bristol Lodekka. It was designed as a fully-integral vehicle, utilising two sub frames like the contemporary Routemaster. Four pre-production examples were bodied by Crossley with an aluminium body; production examples bodied by Park Royal were introduced from 1958 with steel body frames at the request of British Electric Traction.

In 1960 a forward-entrance version with slightly different driveline layout was introduced. A total of 180 were produced before it was superseded by the AEC Renown in 1963. East Yorkshire Motor Services were the largest customer, purchasing 50.

In popular culture
Bulgy the Double-Decker bus, his friend and 25 Australian buses  from the Railway Series and the children's television series Thomas & Friends is based on the AEC Bridgemaster.

References

External links

Bridgemaster
Double-decker buses
Vehicles introduced in 1956
Half-cab buses